Djamilya Abdullaeva (born December 14, 1984) is an Uzbek model and actress in South Korea. Djamilya's personal life attracted significant media attention during KBS World Channel Misuda three – month also her main role TVC for Water park Gyeongju, South Korea 'California Beach' and in 2009 her self-titled album Djamilya was released worldwide.

Life and career

Early life
Djamilya was born on December 14, 1984 in Tashkent. Djamilya's school activities included basketball and football, which she played with a male schoolmate. While growing up, she was fond of ballet and frequently visited a local piano class. For the next few years, she continued to take part in school musicals.

Modeling

Djamilya began modelling at age 16 after graduation, where she signed with Figaro Model Management. She claimed first runner-up at the 2004 Miss Hyundai Department Store Competition held in Tashkent. She has done extensive work in most of Asia's major markets – including Tokyo, Seoul, Hong Kong, Taipei and India — where she feels mixed heritage models are more successful. In 2007 she signed with Hanmaroo Model Management after moving to Seoul. Her modeling career reached its summit in 2007 when she was broadcast for KBS World Channel Global Talk Show. She had reached celebrity status 연예인 스타화보 in 2008. Djamilya's Star Photo is being provided by SK Telecom and KTF. Djamilya was becoming prominent as an actress and singer in Seoul and across the South Korea.

As popular performer of KBS2 Misuda she was featured for online game (The King 온라인 게임 패왕의 모델 자밀라.

Djamilya threw the first pitch at the opening game in Incheon Munhak Stadium Baseball Samsung PAVV, SK Wyverns versus KIA Tigers. That year, she was performing "Celebrity game professional pool player Jeanette Lee and Djamilya Abdullaeva" an exhibition match at the XTM Billiards Championship during the 2nd Annual Showdown in 2008.

In November 2012 Djamilya Abdullaeva has served as brand ambassador for the underwear brand Lannote ‘No Bra’ based in Seoul, she was featured in Korean television advertisements products. 
Following this, in the same year she made her first appearance in underwear 'S Line’ for big brand fashion underwear in Seoul.

In the media
Djamilya came to prominence in the television program Global Talk Show KBS World Channel. In 2007 Chit Chat with Beautiful ladies was a hit for the Misuda network, premiering recorded to audience rating 14.05% TNS Media Korea survey result due to the appearance of Djamilya and ranked first in the same time zone. Djamilya surprise appearance with a new born Pomeranian on Global Talk Show KBS2 In the same year for a month, she attracted everyone's attention with her charming voice and slim figure dancing Wonder Girls Tell me. Also her main role in the CGV TV movie '색시몽 리턴즈'. Comedy TV reality show Legally Blonde, which lasted 2 seasons and in 2009 her self-titled album Djamilya was released worldwide.
Djamilya had confessed to being an admirer of the South Korean actor, Kwon Sang-woo on the Global Talk Show. At the invitation of the actor, she gained the opportunity to meet him on her birthday during the shooting of the TV Series Bad Love for the KBS Network.
The report stated that Djamilya's coquetry is unmatched and incomparable. She ranked first ‘Coquetry Queen’ spring breeze the best female star’  No one can copy Jamila's individuality manners' 역시 교태퀸'… 자밀라 35.9％ – 표몰이 한예슬 29.8％- 현영 11.5％ 2–3위 On Saturday evening Talk Show Misuda Djamilya showed dance Wonder Girls "Tel Me" with other guests on the air and a small tattoo on her left shoulder was captured on camera. This video is distributed on every portal called "Djamilya Tattoo". Djamilya childhood photo. Djamilya did Star Hwabo filming in Malaysia at Luxury Resort Kota Kinabalu, her star photos will be providing service in SKT, KTF and LGT.

Filmography

TV Shows

Reality Shows

Film

Video Games

Advertisement

Music

Music Video

References

External links 

1984 births
Living people
Mass media people from Tashkent
Uzbekistani television personalities
Uzbekistani expatriates in South Korea
Actors from Tashkent
South Korean mass media people